Jeremiah Parker (born November 15, 1977) is a former American football defensive end who played one season in the National Football League (NFL) for the New York Giants. He played college football for California and was selected in the 7th round (217th overall) of the 2000 NFL Draft by the Giants.

Early life and education
Jeremiah Parker was born on November 15, 1977, in Franklin, Louisiana. His family moved to Richmond, California, when he was young, and he attended De Anza High School, graduating in 1996. He was recruited by several Pac-10 Conference football teams, and chose California, to be close to his home. He was given immediate playing time as a freshman, earning a varsity letter in his first year. He remained a varsity member each season, until graduating in 2000. As a member of California, Parker played defensive end, weighing between 250 and 300 pounds in separate seasons.

Professional career
Upon graduating in 2000, Parker was selected in the seventh round (217th overall) of the 2000 NFL Draft by the New York Giants. Though making the team, Parker saw limited playing time as a rookie, staying inactive for all but four games of the season. He was predominantly a special teams player, and recorded no statistics other than four games played. Parker was a member of the Giants' Super Bowl XXXV team, and saw them lose 34-7 versus the Baltimore Ravens.

References

1977 births
Living people
Players of American football from Louisiana
Sportspeople from Richmond, California
Players of American football from California
People from Franklin, Louisiana
American football defensive ends
California Golden Bears football players
New York Giants players